Thomas or Tom Lister may refer to:

Thomas Lister (Jesuit) (c. 1559–c. 1628), English Jesuit writer
Thomas Lister (regicide) (1597–1668), colonel in the Parliamentary army during the English Civil War, MP for Lincoln, and judge at the trial of Charles I
Thomas Lister (British politician, born 1658) (1658–1718), Member of Parliament for Lincoln, 1705–1715
Thomas Lister (British politician, born 1688) (1688–1745), Member of Parliament for Clitheroe, 1713–1745
Thomas Lister (British politician, born 1723) (1723–1761), Member of Parliament for Clitheroe, 1745–1761, son of the above
Thomas Lister, 1st Baron Ribblesdale (1752–1826), Member of Parliament for Clitheroe, 1773–1790, son of the above
Thomas Lister, 2nd Baron Ribblesdale (1790–1832), English peer, son of the above
Thomas Henry Lister (1800–1842), British novelist and Registrar-General, great-grandson of Thomas Lister (1688–1745)
Thomas Lister, 3rd Baron Ribblesdale (1828–1876), English peer, son of the 2nd Baron Ribblesdale
Sir Thomas Villiers Lister (1832–1902), British diplomat, son of Thomas Henry Lister
Thomas Lister, 4th Baron Ribblesdale (1854–1925), British Liberal politician, son of the 3rd Baron Ribblesdale
Thomas David Lister (1869–1924), British physician
Tom Lister (rugby union) (1943–2017), New Zealand rugby union player
Tommy Lister Jr. (1958–2020), American actor
Tom Lister (actor) (born 1978), English actor

See also
Thomas Lester (disambiguation)